This list is of the Places of Scenic Beauty of Japan located within the Prefecture of Fukushima.

National Places of Scenic Beauty
As of 1 July 2020, five Places have been designated at a national level; Landscape of Oku no Hosomichi is a serial designation spanning ten prefectures.

Prefectural Places of Scenic Beauty
As of 18 February 2020, seven Places have been designated at a prefectural level.

Municipal Places of Scenic Beauty
As of 1 May 2019, thirty-three Places have been designated at a municipal level.

See also
 Cultural Properties of Japan
 List of Historic Sites of Japan (Fukushima)
 List of parks and gardens of Fukushima Prefecture
 List of Cultural Properties of Japan - paintings (Fukushima)

References

External links
  Cultural Properties of Fukushima Prefecture

Tourist attractions in Fukushima Prefecture
Places of Scenic Beauty